Merry Christmas is the first holiday album by American singer/songwriter, Shelby Lynne. It was released on October 12, 2010 by her own label, Eversol Records. The album charted at No. 9 on Billboard's folk chart and No. 31 on their holiday chart.

Critical reception

Thom Jurek of AllMusic writes, "As Christmas albums go, this one is showcase for Lynne's gifts as an interpretive singer and songwriter. It's enjoyable throughout, and the immediacy and warmth of the recording set it apart from the usual holiday fare."

Tony Peters of Icon Fetch says, "She serves up eleven tracks in a little over 30 minutes and it’s over before you know it.  Typical of her original work, there’s some happy and some sad songs here, but nothing overstays their welcome."

Dan MacIntosh of Country Standard Time writes, "This song set provides holiday music for quiet nights before Christmas or hangover-spoiled Christmas mornings. But no matter what way you use it, Merry Christmas! has Shelby Lynne's unique fingerprint on it."

Track listing

Track information and credits adapted from the album's liner notes.

Personnel

Musicians
Shelby Lynne – Acoustic guitar, electric guitar, vocals
Michael Ward – Acoustic guitar, electric guitar
John Jackson – Acoustic guitar, electric guitar, percussion
Dave Koz – Alto saxophone
Jim Honeyman – Clarinet, flute
Gregg Field – Drums
Marc Doten – Electric upright bass
Val McCallum – Harmonica, acoustic guitar
Ben Peeler – Mandolin, steel guitar, lap steel Guitar
Dave Palmer – Piano, Wurlitzer

Production
Shelby Lynne – Producer
Doug Sax – Mastering
Sangwook Nam – Mastering
Al Schmitt – Mixing
Steve Genewick – Mixing assistant
Elizabeth Jordan – Executive producer
Brian Harrison – Engineer
Chuck Kavooras – Engineer
Wally Gagel – Associate engineer
Franklin Moorer – Cover photos
Victory Tischler-Blue – Art direction, design, photography
Terry Doty – Coordination

Charts

References

External links
Shelby Lynne Official Site

Shelby Lynne albums
2010 Christmas albums